El Pollo Loco, Inc., is a restaurant chain based in the United States, specializing in Mexican-style grilled chicken. Restaurant service consists of: dine-in, take-out, with some locations offering drive through options. The company is headquartered in Costa Mesa, California, and operates about 500 (as of January 2019) company-owned and franchised restaurants in the Southwestern United States.

Fare

El Pollo Loco prepares primarily Mexican chicken entrees. The company describes its chicken as "citrus-marinated and fire-grilled." The American company also offers Mexican-style food, such as tacos, burritos, enchiladas, and quesadillas.

In a bid to compete with such companies as KFC and Chick-fil-A, El Pollo Loco experimented with offering deep fried chicken in the form of breaded chicken tenders at selected locations in the United States for a limited time during the Fall 2016. This experiment was a big departure from its previous marketing campaigns that tout their fire-grilled chicken as a healthful alternative to fried chicken.

History

Juan Francisco Ochoa started the restaurant in Guasave, Sinaloa, Mexico, in 1975.

By 1979 the chain had expanded throughout northern Mexico. On December 8, 1980, Ochoa opened his first U.S. restaurant in Los Angeles, California, at 503 Alvarado Street, near Sixth Street. The first American location was only  and it grossed more than $125,000 per month during its first year of operation. The initial menu was very simple: a choice of a half or whole chicken with a packet of warm tortillas and a cup of salsa. A second location was opened in Santa Ana in the fall of 1981.

In 1983, the 19 American restaurants in the chain were acquired by Denny's with an agreement that the Ochoa family would continue to operate the restaurants in Mexico under the corporate name El Pollo Loco, S.A. de C.V. where it continues to operate. After 18 months of new ownership, the American owned El Loco Pollo, Inc. had increased the number of locations in Southern California from 19 to 29 while adding 6 locations in distant Houston, Texas, with almost all of the new locations were franchise operations.

Four years later the 70-unit El Pollo Loco was acquired by TW Services when TW Services purchased  El Pollo Loco's then parent Denny's Inc. in 1987 for $218 million in cash.

In May 1990, El Pollo Loco opened its 200th restaurant. That new restaurant was located in Yorba Linda, California. During the early 1990s the company experimented with many different concepts to increase marketshare in the competitive Southern Californian fast food industry. In 1994 the company test marketed at a select few locations: a side-dish bar, salsa bar, and barbecue at some locations, while other locations tried selling french fries or ice cream. Only salsa bars survived the test and were introduced chainwide the following year. The company also tested home delivery and catering in 1995.

In August 1995, El Pollo Loco earned a place in the Guinness Book of World Records for building the world's largest burrito in Anaheim, California.

In December 1995, John A. Romandetti replaced Raymond J. Perry as president and chief executive officer. Sixteen months later, Romandetti was replaced by Nelson J. Marchioli as president and chief executive officer in April 1997 when Romandetti was transferred to sister company Denny's as its new CEO.

On July 12, 1997, Flagstar, the parent company of El Pollo Loco and Denny's, filed for Chapter 11 bankruptcy.

American Securities Capital Partners acquired the 274-location El Pollo Loco in 1999 for $114 Million from Advantica (formerly called TW Services) and later sold it to Trimaran Capital Partners in 2005 for $400 Million with 328 locations.

In April 2001, Stephen Carley replaced Nelson J. Marchioli as president and chief executive officer. Marchioli left EPL, Inc., to head its former parent company Advantica.

In January 2007, El Pollo Loco was featured on NBC TV's hit show The Apprentice: Los Angeles where contestants competed by creating and selling versions of El Pollo Loco's Pollo Bowl. El Pollo Loco was recognized by the World Franchising Network as a Top Franchise for Hispanics in 2010.

New locations were first open by franchisees in the states of Utah and Oregon in 2008. The 400th location was opened in Chelsea, Massachusetts in May 2008.

In August 2010, president and chief executive officer Steve Carley unexpectedly resigned to head Red Robin Gourmet Burgers.

In January 2011, Steve Sather was officially named president and chief executive officer after serving since the previous August as acting CEO.

In July 2014, El Loco Pollo became a publicly traded company on NASDAQ.

In October 2016, the company announced that it had teamed up with a Louisiana-based franchisee who plans to build and open two units in Lafayette, Louisiana, sometime in 2018. In the following year, the Louisiana-based franchisee announced that construction of the first Lafayette was going to start in the upcoming month with an anticipated opening in the late spring of 2018. The first restaurant in Louisiana finally open in Lafayette in March 2018.

In March 2018, Bernard Acoca replaced Steve Sather as president and chief executive officer. Acoca previously served as president of Teavana. In October 2021, Acoca resigned, citing a desire "to pursue other opportunities". In March 2022, El Pollo Loco announced that CFO Larry Roberts, who has been serving as interim CEO since October 2021,  was appointed as the company's new president and CEO.

Plans were announced in November 2021 of the opening of several restaurants in the Denver metropolitan area via two different Colorado-based franchises. The first Colorado restaurant is expected to open in 2022.

Temporary expansion eastward
Throughout its history, El Pollo Loco, tried at various times to expand beyond its core territories of California and the American Southwest, but the attempts were not very successful.

In 1987, then owner TW Services began to open restaurants in the Orlando, Florida area, starting in Winter Park. Five restaurants were eventually built but all five were forced to close in 1991.

A second expansion attempt, mainly though franchises, was started in 2006 under then-owner Trimaran Capital Partners. All of these locations were closed within six years.

During this time, El Pollo Loco or its franchisees briefly operated several restaurants in metro Atlanta, and Boston, New Jersey, and in the Hampton Roads area of Virginia; these closed by 2011. The chain's franchised restaurants in the Portland, Oregon metropolitan area also closed in 2011. An El Pollo Loco in the Foxwoods Resort Casino in Connecticut closed in spring 2012. The last of four Chicago area stores closed at the end of 2012.

Locations in the United States
In the U.S., El Pollo Loco operated over 400 company-owned and franchised restaurants in Arizona, California, Colorado, Nevada, Texas, Utah, and Louisiana in 2017. In 2012, El Pollo Loco restaurants went through a major makeover.

Locations outside North America
Under Denny's and its successors, El Pollo Loco, Inc., had sold franchise licenses to operators based in East Asia.

In 1987, TW Services made a deal with the major Japanese trading company Mitsui & Co. to open 484 restaurants across Japan, at the same time that Taco Time and Taco Bell were opening their first locations in the country. The first of these opened in Tokyo in 1988. All of the Japanese locations closed by 1994.

By 1997, EPL, Inc., had franchises located in Malaysia, Singapore, and the Philippines. The franchise licenses for both Malaysia and Singapore has since lapsed. In July 2016, the Delgado family, owners of the El Pollo Loco franchise in the Philippines, filed a lawsuit against EPL, Inc. in the Regional Trial Court so it could retain the El Pollo Loco trademark in that country after the franchise contract had terminated. In the following year, The Bistro Group acquired the brand with its two locations, in the SM Megamall and in the SM Mall of Asia, in July 2017.

Charity partners
The brand created Fire-Grilled Fundraisers, an initiative for nonprofit organizations to raise funds for their cause while dining at the restaurant. They also created El Pollo Loco Charities, a nonprofit 501(c) charity to provide meals to underprivileged families, in 2005.

In 2019, the brand launched Pollo with Purpose, a company-wide food donation program, in partnership with Food Donation Connection. The program's stated goal was to donate 500,000 pounds of food annually.

See also
 List of fast-food chicken restaurants

References

External links
 

Fast-food Mexican restaurants
Fast-food chains of the United States
Fast-food franchises
Fast casual restaurants
Fast-food poultry restaurants
Regional restaurant chains in the United States
Restaurants in Greater Los Angeles
Restaurants in California
Restaurants established in 1980
Companies that filed for Chapter 11 bankruptcy in 1997
Companies based in Costa Mesa, California
1980 establishments in California
Companies listed on the Nasdaq
Economy of the Southwestern United States
2014 initial public offerings
Chicken chains of the United States